The Uttarakhand Police is the law enforcement agency for the state of Uttarakhand in India and it was formed in 2000.

Organisational structure
Uttarakhand Police comes under the direct control of Department of Home Affairs, Government of Uttarakhand.
The Uttarakhand Police is headed by Director General of Police (DGP).

Hierarchy

Officers

 Director General of Police (DGP) (IPS)
 Additional Director General of Police (ADG) (IPS)
 Inspector General of Police (IG) (IPS)
 Deputy Inspector General of Police (DIG) (IPS)
 Senior Superintendent of Police (SSP) (IPS)
 Superintendent of Police (SP) (IPS)
 Additional Superintendent of Police (Addl. SP) (UPS)
 Assistant Superintendent of Police (ASP) or Deputy Superintendent of Police (DSP) (UPS)

Sub-ordinates
 Inspector of Police 
 Sub-Inspector of Police (SI) 
 Assistant Sub-Inspector of Police (ASI)
 Head Constable (HC)
 Senior Constable (SC)
 Constable

See also
Uttar Pradesh Police
State Disaster Response Force Uttarakhand

References

Government of Uttarakhand
State law enforcement agencies of India
2000 establishments in Uttarakhand